New Market Presbyterian Church may refer to:

New Market Presbyterian Church (New Market, Alabama), listed on the National Register of Historic Places in Madison County, Alabama
New Market Presbyterian Church (New Market, Tennessee), listed on the National Register of Historic Places in Jefferson County, Tennessee